Elachista corneola is a moth of the family Elachistidae that is found in Western Australia.

The species have pale grey forewings with grey hindwings.

References

corneola
Moths described in 2011
Endemic fauna of Australia
Moths of Australia
Taxa named by Lauri Kaila